The 2023 Vuelta a San Juan is a road cycling stage race that takes place in the San Juan Province of Argentina between 22 and 29 January 2023. The race is rated as a 2.Pro event as part of the 2023 UCI ProSeries, and is the 39th edition of the Vuelta a San Juan.

Teams
Twenty-six teams were invited to the race. Of these teams, seven are UCI WorldTour teams, five are UCI Professional Continental teams, ten are UCI Continental teams, and four are national teams. 

UCI WorldTeams

 
 
 
 
 
 
 

UCI Professional Continental Teams

 
 
 
 Team Corratec
 

UCI Continental Teams

 
 
 
 
 
 
 
 
 
 

National Teams

 Argentina
 Chile
 Italy
 Uruguay

Route

Stages

Stage 1 
22 January 2023 — San Juan to San Juan,

Stage 2 
23 January 2023 — Valle Fértil to Jáchal,

Stage 3 
24 January 2023 — Circuito San Juan Villicum to Circuito San Juan Villicum,

Stage 4 
25 January 2023 — Circuito San Juan Villicum to Barreal,

Rest day 
26 January 2023

Stage 5 
27 January 2023 — Chimbas to Alto Colorado,

Stage 6 
28 January 2023 — Velódromo Vicente Chancay to Velódromo Vicente Chancay,

Stage 7 
29 January 2023 — San Juan to San Juan,

Classification leadership table

Final classification standings

General classification

Mountains classification

Sprints classification

Young rider classification

Teams classification

References

2023
2023 UCI ProSeries
2023 in Argentine sport
January 2023 sports events in Argentina